Lumberton Independent School District is a public school district based in Lumberton, Texas (USA).

In addition to Lumberton, the district serves the city of Rose Hill Acres.

The Lumberton Independent School District contains approximately 3708 students as of October 2007.

In 2009, the school district was rated "academically acceptable" by the Texas Education Agency.

District Administration
Lumberton ISD is administered by an elected Board of Trustees that are elected every year in rotating terms. Each seat is an open election, with no districts or wards.

As of May, 2011, the LISD Board of Trustees is as follows:
President: James Kersh
Vice-President: Margaret Cruse
Secretary: Chad Hammett
Members: ; Kenny Burkhalter, Kevin Edwards, James Glenn and Brett Yarbro

District Administration:
Superintendent: Dr. Tony Tipton
Assistant Superintendent: Patty Crouch
Assistant Superintendent: Anna Miller
Athletic Director: Coach Babin
Band Director: Jason Anderson

Schools
Lumberton High School (Grades 9-12)
Lumberton Middle (Grades 7-8)
Lumberton Intermediate (Grades 4-6)
Lumberton Primary (Grades 1-3)
Lumberton Early Childhood (Grades PK, K)

References

External links

School districts in Hardin County, Texas